Raúl "Rayito" García Hirales (born September 10, 1982) is a Mexican former professional boxer. He has held the IBF mini flyweight title from June 2008 until March 2010 and WBO mini flyweight title from April 2011 until October 2011. He is the twin brother of former WBO light flyweight champion Ramón García Hirales.

Professional career
On June 14, 2008, he challenged Filipino IBF mini flyweight champion Florante Condes and defeated him by a 12 round split decision in La Paz, Mexico. He defended his IBF title four times. Garcia lost the IBF mini flyweight title against South African Nkosinathi Joyi on 26 March 2010 by a unanimous decision.

After losing his IBF title, Garcia went on to win the WBO interim mini flyweight title on October 30, 2010 by a split decision against Luis de la Rosa. He was scheduled to face Donnie Nietes on March 12, 2011 for the full championship, however, just two weeks prior to the fight date, Nietes announced that he would be vacating his world title and moving up in weight. Therefore, Garcia was promoted to full champion. On May 30, 2011, he successfully defended the title for the first time by third round tko against Rommel Asenjo. Garcia and his brother Ramón made history on this night when they became the first set of twin brothers to win world title fights on the same card.

See also 
List of Mini-flyweight boxing champions
List of Mexican boxing world champions

References

External links

Boxers from Baja California Sur
People from La Paz, Baja California Sur
Living people
International Boxing Federation champions
Mini-flyweight boxers
World mini-flyweight boxing champions
1982 births
World Boxing Organization champions
Twin sportspeople
Mexican twins
Mexican male boxers
Southpaw boxers
21st-century Mexican people